Shahjahan Noori (Persian/Dari: شاه جهان نوری) (30 March 1965 – 28 May 2011), also known as General Shahjahan Noori, He was an Afghan guerrilla, military and police commander, during resistance against Soviet invasion and fight against terrorist groups such as Taliban and Al-Qaeda between 1981 and 2011.

Military career

Afghan-Soviet War 
He joined Ahmad Shah Massoud Central Units/Special Forces (Qeta'at -e- Markazi - the forces which later formed Afghan Armed Forces), military training camp in October 1985 received military and political training;, He conducted the capturing operation of most villages and districts including; Farkhar, Andarab and Nahrin garrisons in 1986, Kalafgan and Kuran wa Munjan Garrisons in 1987.

In 1985, at the time when the communist government was on the verge of collapse, Ahmad Shah Massoud assigned General Noori to led a group of nearly thousand Mujahideen, including many senior commanders with a political delegation to handover the security responsibility strategic border Hairatan Mazar -i- Sharif from General Abdul Momen 70th division of Afghan Army of Mohammad Najibullah government.

During Islamic State of Afghanistan 1991-1996 
After the fallen of Moscow-backed government, Mujaheedin took Kabul the capital, General Noori became the commander of 32nd Regiment (Ghond 32) in Kabul. In 1993, he was promoted to rank brigadier general by late President Burhanuddin Rabbani.

Resistance against Taliban and Al-Qaeda 1996-2001 
In 1996 Kabul Fallen to hand of Taliban, at this time the Islamic State of Afghanistan retreated to north of country. General Noori established the first command and control and defensive line in Bangi district  of Takhar to defend the Taloqan city against Taliban offensive attack.

On July 2, 1997 Taliban captured Taliqan the Takhar provincial capital for one day, General Noori and other Northern Alliances commanders retreated to Farkhar Valley, on July 3, 1997, he returned along with other Massoud's commanders and took back control of the city. then General Noori was assigned by Ahmad shah massoud as 4th zone commander and his area of responsibility was the north of Taloqan, Nahr-e-Chaman and Namakab district and at same time he was command and controlling front line in Bangi to defend the province against Taliban offensive attacks.

On August 8, 1998, the Taliban captured the northern opposition capital Mazar-i-Sharif. On August 11, they captured Taloqan, the Takhar provincial capital, the latest in a series of spectacular victories. General Noori retreated to his village Mashtan of Farkhar District in the border of Badakhshan. He received a letter from Amir Khan Motaqi invited him to join the Taliban but he refused and continued to resistance and just after 9 days on August 17, 1998, on offensive attack with his comrades he retook the strategic districts of Warsaj and Farkhar with taking 230 Taliban soldiers prisoners. in re-action the Taliban arrested hundreds of opposition members, mainly Tajiks including General Noori's younger brother Mohibullah Noori. On October 17, 1998, General Noori and other Northern Alliances commanders recaptured the previous Rabbani-stronghold of Taloqan city from the Taliban. (AFP, October 17, October 18, October 23). In the late 1998 a new forces was established by Ahmad Shah Massoud called Central Forces-Qowai-e-Markaz and Gen Noori was assigned as deputy commander, the forces which later suppose to form Afghanistan National Army.

In September 1999, the Taliban stepped up their pressure on United Front positions in northern Afghanistan, north of Kunduz city and to the east of Khanabad town in Takhar Province. The Taliban pushed through Bangi and threatened to take Taloqan, Commander Ahmad Shah Massoud's main command and control center and Gen Noori as command and controlling commander in Bangi had an important role in defending of Taloqan city and Taliban failed to capture the city.

In June 2000, the Taliban reinforced by foreigner fighters and conducted huge attack and sieged the city, This war was considered the most harsh and unequal war with the Taliban. The war lasted more than a month, with 20,000 Taliban, Pakistani fighters and al-Qaeda terrorists from many countries. This war caused in injuring of Gen Noori and the city fall to the Taliban. United front spokesman said to APN''Our fighters suffered several casualties during the fighting, but none when we were pulling out.″ Amnesty International reported that during the fighting in Taloqan, the Taliban bombarded a village, burned all of the houses there, and killed some of the villagers. It was also reported that the Taliban cut the throat of one man in front of his relatives. Resistance to forced conscription resulted in an increased Taliban dependence on foreign volunteers. There were reports that some prisoners of the Taliban, including the sons of families that had opposed Taliban social restrictions, were drafted forcibly and sent to the front. The Taliban reportedly followed a longstanding practice of forcibly expelling ethnic Hazara and Tajiks from areas controlled by the Taliban, and otherwise harassing these minorities. In October 2000, the Northern Alliance alleged that the Taliban forced the residents of Humber Koh and Hazrab villages near Taloqan to leave their homes before burning the dwellings. The conflict leading up to the fall of Taloqan in September 2000 displaced 60,000 to 75,000 persons.

The United Front forces reiterated to Farkhar valley said United Front spokesman to APN "We pulled out of the city to avoid civilian casualties.″, Gen Noori transferred to Tajikistan for treatment and after he cured he return back to the Farkhar valley and appointed as deputy northeastern front and from 2000 till 9/11 which USA was entered to Afghanistan Gen Noori for two years was command and controlling the northeastern forces.

Police career 
In October 2001, after collapsing of the Taliban regime, he was appointed as 999 Brigade of Takhar Province and he served in Afghan National Army until 2003.

In 2003, he joined Afghan National Police he appointed as Badakhshan Chief of Police, in Badakhshan province struggled to disarm illegal armed groups and arrest drug smugglers in an interview with IRINNews he concerned about illegal armed groups and smugglers:"We need commandos, we need police, we need helicopters. Commanders [warlords] are strong. They must be brought under control," he shouted down the phone while preparing for another operation to quell clashes between militia groups that had plagued the isolated province since early May. Northeastern Afghanistan, including the province of Badakhshan, is ironically seen as one of the safest regions in a country rife with insecurity, especially in the south and the east. But it remains a major source of concern to people like Noori who wish to tame the power of local warlords without plunging the region into new conflict.

From 2006 till 2010 he served as chief police in Ghor Province.

In 2010, the Taliban's tried to nesting in the northern provinces of Afghanistan, especially Takhar, caused deep concern to the Afghan government, during this time the central government appoint General Noori as Police Chief Takhar province, in early of his duty he conduct recapture operation of six districts (Khwaja Ghar, Chah Ab, Khwaja Ghar, Yangi Qala, Khwaja Bahawuddin, Darqad, Dashti Qala) which is known as Mawara -e- Kokcha the operation lasted two months, which led to the complete recapture of the districts. During the operation, General Noori survived a Taliban ambush attack. In reaction Taliban assassinated him on May 28, 2011.

References 

1965 births
2011 deaths
Government ministers of Afghanistan
Afghan Tajik people
 
People murdered in Afghanistan
People killed by the Taliban
Deaths by explosive device
Chiefs of police
Afghan military officers

Politicians
Afghan